Nikola Ogrodníková (born 18 August 1990) is a Czech athlete specialising in the javelin throw. She won the silver medal at the 2018 European Championships.

Her personal best in the event is 67.40 metres set in Offenburg in 2019. Earlier in her career she competed in the heptathlon. She won a bronze medal in that discipline at the 2007 European Junior Championships.

International competitions

References

1990 births
Living people
Czech female javelin throwers
Czech heptathletes
World Athletics Championships athletes for the Czech Republic
Sportspeople from Ostrava
European Games competitors for the Czech Republic
Athletes (track and field) at the 2019 European Games
Athletes (track and field) at the 2020 Summer Olympics
Olympic athletes of the Czech Republic